Clarion County is a county in the Commonwealth of Pennsylvania.  As of the 2020 census, the population was 37,241. Its county seat is Clarion. The county was formed on March 11, 1839, from parts of Venango and Armstrong counties. Clarion County is entirely defined as part of the Pittsburgh media market.

Geography
It has a warm-summer humid continental climate (Dfb), and average temperatures in Clarion borough range from 24.5 °F in January to 82 °F in July.

Adjacent counties
Forest County (north)
Jefferson County (east)
Armstrong County (south)
Butler County (west)
Venango County (west)

Parks
Part of Cook Forest State Park is in Clarion County.

The Clarion County Park is located in Paint Township. Clarion County Veterans Memorial Park is located directly across Main Street (Route 322) from the Clarion County Courthouse in the center of the Borough of Clarion.

Major highways

Demographics

As of the census of 2000, there were 41,765 people, 16,052 households, and 10,738 families residing in the county.  The population density was 69 people per square mile (27/km2).  There were 19,426 housing units at an average density of 32 per square mile (12/km2).  The racial makeup of the county was 98.16% White, 0.79% Black or African American, 0.11% Native American, 0.34% Asian, 0.08% from other races, and 0.52% from two or more races.  0.41% of the population were Hispanic or Latino of any race. 43.9% were English or Welsh, 12.9% American, 10.5% German, 8.0% Irish, 6.3% Scotch-Irish, 5.5% Italian and 2.6% Dutch, and 2.0% French ancestry.

There were 16,052 households, out of which 28.60% had children under the age of 18 living with them, 54.90% were married couples living together, 8.40% had a female householder with no husband present, and 33.10% were non-families. 26.00% of all households were made up of individuals, and 11.30% had someone living alone who was 65 years of age or older.  The average household size was 2.46 and the average family size was 2.95.

In the county, the population was spread out, with 21.60% under the age of 18, 15.40% from 18 to 24, 25.20% from 25 to 44, 22.70% from 45 to 64, and 15.20% who were 65 years of age or older.  The median age was 36 years. For every 100 females there were 93.30 males.  For every 100 females age 18 and over, there were 90.40 males.

2020 Census

Government

|}

Voter Registration
As of February 21, 2022, there are 23,454 registered voters in Clarion County.

 Democratic: 6,247 (26.64%)
 Republican: 14,567 (62.11%)
 Independent: 1,851 (7.89%)
 Third Party: 789 (3.36%)

County Commissioners
 Wayne Brosius; Republican
 Ted Tharan; Republican
 Ed Heasley; Democrat

Other county officials
 Hon. James G. Arner, senior judge, Pennsylvania Courts of Common Pleas
 Hon. Sara Seidle-Patton, president judge, Pennsylvania Courts of Common Pleas
 Duane L. Quinn (18-3-01), district judge
 Timothy P. Schill (18-3-02), district judge
 Jarah L Heeter (18-3-03), district judge
 Jeffery C. Miller (18-3-04), district judge
 Drew Welsh; Republican, District Attorney
 Rex Munsee; Republican, sheriff
 Karyn Montana; Republican, treasurer

State Senate

State House of Representatives

United States House of Representatives

United States Senate

Education

Colleges and universities
Clarion University of Pennsylvania

Public school districts
 Allegheny-Clarion Valley School District
 Clarion Area School District
 Clarion-Limestone Area School District
 Karns City Area School District
 Keystone School District
 North Clarion County School District
 Redbank Valley School District
 Union School District

Intermediate unit
Public school districts and private schools in the county are served by Riverview Intermediate Unit IU6 which provides special education and professional development services.

Technical school
Clarion County Career Center is located along State Route 66 in Marianne (Shippenville address).

Private schools
Alexander Amish School - Venus
Bear Run School - Knox
Christs Dominion Academy - Summerville
Clarion Center School - Clarion
County Corner - Knox
Deer View School - Mayport
Immaculate Conception School - Clarion
Little Bird Preschool - New Bethlehem
Meadow View Amish School - Knox
New Bethlehem Mennonite School - New Bethlehem
Shady Nook Amish School - Sligo
St Josephs School - Lucinda
Zacheral Amish School - Venus

Communities

Under Pennsylvania law, there are four types of incorporated municipalities: cities, boroughs, townships, and, in at most two cases, towns. The following boroughs and townships are located in Clarion County:

Boroughs

Callensburg
Clarion (county seat)
East Brady
Foxburg
Hawthorn
Knox
New Bethlehem
Rimersburg
Shippenville
Sligo
St. Petersburg
Strattanville

Townships

Ashland
Beaver
Brady
Clarion
Elk
Farmington
Highland
Knox
Licking
Limestone
Madison
Millcreek
Monroe
Paint
Perry
Piney
Porter
Redbank
Richland
Salem
Toby
Washington

Census-designated places
Crown
Leeper
Marianne
Tylersburg
Vowinckel

Population ranking
The population ranking of the following table is based on the 2010 census of Clarion County.

† county seat

Notable people
Marietta Bones (1842–1901) - suffragist, social reformer, philanthropist
Fred Caligiuri (1918–2018) - Major League Baseball pitcher (Philadelphia Athletics, 1941, 1942); as of 2018 was the oldest living major-league player; born in Forest County; former resident of Knox and Rimersburg
Hunter Corbett - pioneer American Presbyterian missionary to China, ministered in China for 56 years
Jim Kelly - NFL athlete (Buffalo Bills); grew up in East Brady
Chris Kirkpatrick - musician ('N Sync); born in Clarion
Dominick Labino - glass artist; born in Fairmount City (Redbank Township); managed the Owens-Illinois glass plant in Clarion 
Ossee Schreckengost - Major League Baseball player; born in New Bethlehem
Randall Silvis - author and screenwriter; born in Madison Township
Grace M. Sloan (1902–2001), Pennsylvania state treasurer and auditor general
Ernest M. Skinner - pipe organ builder, inventor; born in Clarion
Jane Wolfe - silent film actress and thelemite; born in St. Petersburg

See also

 National Register of Historic Places listings in Clarion County, Pennsylvania
 Oil Creek Library District

References

 
1839 establishments in Pennsylvania
Populated places established in 1839
Counties of Appalachia